Robert Huston Carnahan was a grain merchant before the American Civil War and a mine superintendent after the war. He was a Union Army officer during the Civil War. He was appointed a captain of the 3rd Regiment Illinois Volunteer Cavalry on August 24, 1861, lieutenant colonel on September 20, 1864 and colonel on April 9, 1865.

Carnahan's regiment served as part of Major General John C. Fremont's campaign to re-capture Springfield, Missouri from Confederate forces at the First Battle of Springfield. When the Union Army arrived in Springfield, only thirty families remained. In December 1861, his regiment became part of the Army of the Southwest led by Brigadier General Samuel Ryan Curtis.  Carnahan's regiment served at the Battle of Nashville.

On January 13, 1866, President Andrew Johnson nominated Carnahan for appointment to the grade of brevet brigadier general of volunteers, to rank from October 28, 1865, and the United States Senate confirmed the appointment on March 12, 1866.

Robert H. Carnahan died on June 14, 1913 at Danville, Illinois. He is buried at Spring Hill Cemetery, Danville.

See also
List of American Civil War brevet generals (Union)

References

External links
 

Union Army colonels
1913 deaths